Kalateh-ye Sheykh may refer to:
 Kalateh-ye Sheykh, Razavi Khorasan
 Kalateh-ye Sheykh, Sarbisheh, South Khorasan Province